A monogram is a motif made by overlapping or combining two or more letters or other graphemes to form one symbol.

Monogram may also refer to:

 Monogram (artwork), a combine painting by American artist Robert Rauschenberg
 Monogram (company), a United States scale model manufacturer
 Monogram Foods, a United States packaged foods manufacturer
 Monogram Pictures, a Hollywood studio
 Monogram Records, a United States record label
 Varsity letter or monogram, an award earned in the United States for excellence in school activities
 Monograms, a package tour operator, part of Globus family of brands

See also
 Major Francis Monogram, a character in the animated television series Phineas and Ferb